Cory Sweeney is a New Zealand rugby sevens coach. He is currently the New Zealand women's national rugby sevens team Head Coach. He was appointed after the Tokyo Olympics.

Sweeney was the Black Ferns Sevens assistant coach in 2016. He then Co-coached the Black Ferns Sevens team with Allan Bunting from 2019 until the Tokyo Olympics in 2021. He was nominated with Allan Bunting for the Halberg Coach of the Year award in 2022.

References 

Living people
New Zealand rugby union coaches
Rugby sevens in New Zealand
New Zealand Olympic coaches
New Zealand national rugby sevens team coaches
Year of birth missing (living people)